Langfeldt is a Norwegian surname. Notable people with the surname include:

Einar Langfeldt (1884–1966), Norwegian physician
Gabriel Langfeldt (1895–1983), Norwegian psychiatrist
Knut Langfeldt (born 1925), Norwegian political scientist
Thore Langfeldt (born 1943), Norwegian psychologist and sexologist

See also
Langfeld

Norwegian-language surnames